Let the Dominoes Fall is the seventh studio album by the American punk rock band Rancid. It is their first album of new material in nearly six years, following 2003's Indestructible, and their first with drummer Branden Steineckert, who joined the band in 2006 after the departure of founding drummer Brett Reed.

The span of nearly six years between Indestructible and Let the Dominoes Fall was Rancid's longest gap between studio albums in their career. The band had begun working on new material after their temporary hiatus in 2004, but showed no signs of a new album until January 2008, when they announced that they had begun recording with producer and Bad Religion guitarist Brett Gurewitz. The writing and recording process was finally finished in February 2009.

Background and composition
Following the release of Indestructible in 2003, the group became dormant with each of the members either touring or releasing albums with other bands. After a break in 2004, Rancid began writing their follow-up to Indestructible a year later. In November 2005, it was announced that the band had begun working on a "large amount of new material" for the album and guitarist Lars Frederiksen mentioned that it would surface sometime in 2006. On April 13, 2006, Rancid posted a large update to their MySpace page and mentioned that the album would be released in the spring of 2007.

For sometime later, it was announced that the release date had been changed to summer/fall 2007, despite frontman Tim Armstrong's solo tour schedule, supporting his first album A Poet's Life. On November 3, it was announced that drummer Brett Reed left the band. His position was filled in by Branden Steineckert, formerly of The Used. Alternative Press mentioned that the group was going to record a new album in early 2007, with a projected mid-2007 release date. On June 12, 2007, Steineckert posted on his MySpace blog stating that members of Rancid were expected to get back together in the fall to begin writing the album, then resume recording it in January 2008. In December of that year, it was reported that Rancid had finished writing the album.

Recording
Recording of the album at Skywalker Sound began in January 2008. The album was completed in early February 2009.  The album is the band's fourth with producer Gurewitz, who previously worked with the band on Let's Go, their self-titled 2000 album, and the previous album, Indestructible.

Some known tracks left off the album include "Darlene'", which was reworked on the self-titled album by Devils Brigade, "Just For Tonight", which was reworked for Tim's Sings RocknRoll Theater album, and the electric version of "The Highway".

Release
On March 30, 2009, Let the Dominoes Fall was announced for release in three months' time; the following day, the track listing and artwork were posted online. "Last One to Die" was made available for streaming on April 7, 2009, via the band's Myspace page. From late April 2009, until the album's release, the band posted several making-of videos online. On May 12, 2009, a music video was released for "Last One to Die". A week later, "Easy Bay Night" was posted on Myspace. Shortly after this, the band performed at the KROQ Weenie Roast. Let the Dominoes Fall was made available for streaming on May 26 on their Myspace, before being released on June 2 through Hellcat Records. "Up to No Good" was released as the album's second single. A deluxe edition of the album was released which included a bonus CD of the entire album in acoustic form, and a DVD featuring a documentary about the making of the album. On June 10, 2009, the band appeared on The Tonight Show with Conan O'Brien, performing "Last One to Die". In June and July, the band supported Rise Against on their headlining tour of the US. On October 12, 2009, a music video was released for "Up to No Good".

Reception

It debuted at number 11 on the Billboard 200, making it Rancid's highest-charting album to date.

Track listing

Bonus tracks

Let the Dominoes Fall acoustic
A version of the album was released on CD with a bonus disc of acoustic versions of songs from the album. These songs are also included in expanded editions of the album at digital download stores such as the iTunes Store and Amazon MP3. Note that all the songs here are acoustic. Not all songs were made into acoustic versions.

Personnel
 Tim Armstrong – guitar, vocals
 Lars Frederiksen – guitar, vocals
 Matt Freeman – bass, vocals
 Branden Steineckert – drums

Additional musicians
 Michael Bolger – horns on "Up to No Good"
 Ryan Foltz – mandolin on "Civilian Ways"
 Greg Graffin – gang vocals on "Disconnected"
 Brett Gurewitz – producer, background vocals, percussion
 Booker T. Jones – keyboards on "Up to No Good"
 Tom Lea – viola on "Up to No Good"
 Joel Pargman – violin on "Up to No Good"
 Vic Ruggiero – keyboards
 Jay Terrien – string arrangement on "Up to No Good"
 Ina Veli – violin on "Up to No Good"
 Pat Wilson – gang vocals on "Damnation"
 Adrienne Woods – cello on "Up to No Good"

Charts

References

External links
 

Rancid (band) albums
2009 albums
Hellcat Records albums